I Am... (stylized in sentence case) is the fourth studio album by Japanese recording artist Ayumi Hamasaki. It was released on New Years Day (January 1), 2002 via Avex Trax and their Taiwan-based headquarters. It was distributed in two physical formats—a standard CD and Playbutton—and for digital consumption. After the September 11, 2001 attacks in New York City, United States, Hamasaki, who started working on her new project, changed the original music and design direction by emphasizing lighter themes than her previous work. As a result, the record delves with hope, peace and love, superimposed on J-Pop-inspired rock music.

Upon its release, I Am... received favorable reviews from music critics. Many publications commended Hamasaki's musical direction and the commercial appeal, while some reviewers noted that some tracks were fillers. Commercially, it experienced huge success in Japan, reaching atop of the Oricon Albums Chart. It was certified triple platinum by the Recording Industry Association of Japan (RIAJ) for shipments of three million units,
the album then won the Album of the Year in Asia Association Music Prize Awards.

In order to promote the album, nearly half of the songs from the record were released as singles; additionally, "M" and "Evolution" sold over one million copies in Japan. After its release, she commenced two concert tours within Japan; a tour and a tour, both of which experienced commercial success and spawned live DVD releases. Before I Am..., Hamasaki felt that she would not enter an Asian market; thus, she never performed outside Japan and did not use English in her lyrics. However, shortly after the release of the album, she performed at the 2002 MTV Asia Music Awards ceremony, her first performance held outside Japan.

Background and development
On September 28, 2000, Hamasaki released her third studio album Duty to critical and commercial success; moreover, it remains her best-selling studio album. Additionally, she started recording her fourth studio album after its release, spawning the single "M" in December that year. However, Hamasaki's label Avex Trax planned an idea to published a musical retrospect, but the singer refused. Avex Trax ignored her refusal and went ahead with the plan, releasing A Best in March 2001 as a "competitive strategy" against Japanese recording artist Hikaru Utada and their album, Distance; this resulted into a minor halt towards her new material. Subsequently, she returned to various studios in Japan to record new work.

However, Hamasaki became emotionally struck by the effects of the September 11 attacks, and had second guesses about certain material on the album. As a result, she decided to scrap the original musical direction a focus on "lighter themes" such as faith and peace. Along with this decision, Hamasaki decided to expand her market by performing outside of Japan; in 2002, she attended and performed at the MTV Video Music Awards in Singapore, her first to do so. During the production and composing phase of the album, Hamasaki became dissatisfied of the results her team had given her for the track "M", so she decided to compose the tune herself. Feeling happier about the change, she focused on composing and producing more material under the alias CREA.

Composition
Musically, I Am... is a rock album that incorporates elements of J-Pop, electronic music and acoustic-driven instrumentation. The record holds 15 tracks, alongside a hidden recording at the end titled "Flower Garden"; this was Hamasaki's second time she performed this strategy, after Loveppears (1999). Additionally, the singer provided 10 compositions to the album, the most participation in any of her records. I Am... sees the return of her previous composers and arrangers: Tasuku, CMJK, Hal, Dai Nagao (under the alias D.A.I.) and Naoto Suzuki, while the album is solely produced by Max Matsuura.

Despite 16 tracks, it consists of two interlude tracks; "Opening Run" and "Taskinlude", and a varied version of "Endless Sorrow", titled the "Gone With the Wind version". Japanese musician Tetsuya Komuro is credited as an additional composer to the record for his and Hamasaki's single "A Song is Born", which originally featured vocals by Komuro's wife Keiko Yamada. Many of the songs on the album shift keys; most shift to a relative key. "M" and "Still Alone" shift to the parallel key; "Evolution" and "Naturally" shift to the dominant and subdominant keys, respectively. The lyrical content on I Am..., as aforementioned, deals with lighter themes such as hope and peace, alongside additional depictions of love and Hamasaki's personal experiences.

Release
I Am... was released on New Years Day (January 1), 2002 via Avex Trax and their Taiwan-based headquarters. It was distributed in two physical formats—a standard CD and Playbutton—and for digital consumption. According to Hamasaki, the original promotional photography had been photographed by Toru Kumazawa, noted to be a lot "darker" than her previous work with him. However, after the singer's change of theme and direction due to the September 11 attacks, she organised another shoot with Kumazawa. The second round of photography depicted Hamasaki in an outfit covered in leaves and vines. She placed a dove on her shoulder for the shot, as a symbolic message of peace and hope. The CD version included a 24-page booklet that featured shots of Hamasaki in a desert, while an additional lyrical booklet came with it. Regarding the change, where she labelled it a "peace muse", she explained;

I had a completely different idea for the cover at first. We'd already reserved the space, decided the hair and makeup and everything. But after the incident, as is typical of me, I suddenly changed my mind. I knew it wasn't the time for gaudiness, for elaborate sets and costumes. It sounds odd coming from me, but I realize what I say and how I look has a great impact.

Track listing

Charts

Oricon Chart (Japan)

Singles

Certifications

Release history

Notes

References

2002 albums
Ayumi Hamasaki albums
Avex Group albums
Japanese-language albums